Ian Ayres is an American filmmaker.

Career
As a director his films include the feature-length documentary The Jill & Tony Curtis Story which was selected for screening at the Bel Air Film Festival, the Montreal World Film Festival, and the Mammoth Film Festival. This 2008 documentary is about the efforts of Tony Curtis and his wife  to rescue horses from slaughterhouses. He is also the director of Tony Curtis: Driven to Stardom a documentary which traces the personal and professional history of the actor.

As a producer, his credits include The Universe of Keith Haring, a documentary  by Christina Clausen about Keith Haring that includes colorful archival footage and interviews with Kenny Scharf and Yoko Ono, gallery owner Tony Shafrazi, and the choreographer Bill T. Jones which was screened at the Tribeca Film Festival, as well as Five Roads to Freedom: From Apartheid to the World Cup a documentary released in 2010 that looks at the revolutionary transformation in South Africa through the eyes of five men and women who lived under the shadow of apartheid. He is working on a feature documentary about Marilyn Monroe.

References

External links

American film directors
Living people
Year of birth missing (living people)